The 1947 World Archery Championships was the 11th edition of the event. It was held in Prague, Czechoslovakia on 12–19 August 1947 and was organised by World Archery Federation (FITA).

Medals summary

Recurve

Medals table

References

External links
 World Archery website
 Complete results 

World Archery
A
World Archery Championships
1947 in archery
Archery competitions in Czechoslovakia